The Star Awards for Best Supporting Actress is an award presented annually at the Star Awards, a ceremony that was established in 1994.

The category was introduced in 1995, at the 2nd Star Awards ceremony; Zhu Xiufeng received the award for her role in Chronicle of Life and it is given in honour of a Mediacorp actress who has delivered an outstanding performance in a supporting role. The nominees are determined by a team of judges employed by Mediacorp; winners are selected by a majority vote from the entire judging panel.

Since its inception, the award has been given to 20 actresses. Lin Meijiao is the most recent winner in this category for her role in My Star Bride. Since the ceremony held in 2009, Xiang Yun remains as the only actress to win in this category four times, surpassing Lin who has three wins. In addition, Xiang Yun has been nominated on 12 occasions, more than any other actress. Lin also holds the record for the most nominations without a win, with seven (she eventually won her first award in 2013). Cynthia Koh and Bonnie Loo are currently the actresses who have the most nominations without a win, with five.

Recipients

Nominees distribution chart

Award records

Multiple awards and nominations

The following individuals received two or more Best Supporting Actress awards:

The following individuals received two or more Best Supporting Actress nominations:

References

External links 

Star Awards